Don Sebastian, King Of Portugal is a 1689 tragedy by the English writer John Dryden. It is based on the reign of Sebastian of Portugal leading up to his defeat and death at the Battle of Alcácer Quibir in 1578. An Elizabethan play The Battle of Alcazar also portrays the events.

It was first staged by the United Company at the Theatre Royal, Drury Lane. The original cast included Joseph Williams as Don Sebastian, Edward Kynaston as Muley Moluch, Thomas Betterton as Dorax, Samuel Sandford as Benducar, Cave Underhill as Mufti, William Mountfort as Don Antonio, John Bowman as Don Alvarez, Anthony Leigh as Mustapha, Elizabeth Barry as Almeyda, Susanna Mountfort as Morayma and Elinor Leigh as Johayma. It was published in 1690 and dedicated to the politician the Earl of Leicester.

References

Bibliography
 Van Lennep, W. The London Stage, 1660-1800: Volume One, 1660-1700. Southern Illinois University Press, 1960.

1689 plays
West End plays
Tragedy plays
Plays by John Dryden